John McEnroe successfully defended the singles title at the U.S. Pro Indoor for a third tournament in a row, defeating Miloslav Mečíř in the final in three straight sets.

Seeds

  John McEnroe (champion)
  Jimmy Connors (semifinals)
  Mats Wilander (second round)
  Eliot Teltscher (quarterfinals)
  Yannick Noah (quarterfinals)
  Joakim Nyström (second round)
  Jimmy Arias (second round)
  Kevin Curren (withdrew)
 Tomáš Šmíd (third round)
 Stefan Edberg (third round)
 Ben Testerman (third round)
 Brad Gilbert (third round)
 Ramesh Krishnan (third round)
N/A
 John Sadri (second round)
 David Pate (second round)

Draw

Final

Top half

Section 1

Section 2

Bottom half

Section 1

Section 2

References
 1985 US Pro Singles Draw

Ebel U.S. Pro Indoor - Singles